Kalansura (also Romanized as Kalānsūrā; also known as Kalānsarā) is a village in Ojarud-e Sharqi Rural District of Muran District, Germi County, Ardabil province, Iran. At the 2006 census, its population was 869 in 168 households. The following census in 2011 counted 723 people in 175 households. The latest census in 2016 showed a population of 606 people in 168 households; it was the largest village in its rural district.

References 

Germi County

Towns and villages in Germi County

Populated places in Ardabil Province

Populated places in Germi County